Isabel de los Ángeles Ruano (born June 3, 1945, in Chiquimula) is a Guatemalan writer, poet, journalist and teacher. In 1954, she moved with her parents to Mexico; they returned to Guatemala three years later, living in various locations within Jutiapa Department and Chiquimula Department. In Chiquimula, she entered the Instituto Normal de Señoritas de Oriente. She graduated from Educación Primaria Urbana with a teacher's diploma in 1964 at the age 18. In 1966, she traveled on her own to Mexico, where she published her first book, entitled Cariátides, the foreword of the book having been written by the Spanish poet León Felipe. Returning to Guatemala in 1967, she began working in journalism. In 1978, she completed her university studies in Spanish and Latin American Language and Literature at the Universidad de San Carlos de Guatemala. In the late 1980s, she began to suffer from mental disorders. She was awarded the Miguel Ángel Asturias National Prize in Literature by the Ministry of Culture in 2001. Dressing as a man, she has lived for several years in Guatemala City's colonia Justo Rufino Barrios, zona 21.

Selected works

Books 
 1967: Cariátides
 1988: Canto de amor a la ciudad de Guatemala
 1988: Torres y tatuajes
 1999: Los del viento
 2002: Café express 
 2006: Versos dorados

Best-known poems

References

1945 births
People from Chiquimula Department
Guatemalan women poets
Guatemalan journalists
Guatemalan women journalists
20th-century Guatemalan women writers
21st-century Guatemalan women writers
Universidad de San Carlos de Guatemala alumni
Living people
20th-century Guatemalan poets
21st-century Guatemalan poets
People from Jutiapa Department